Rujeko is a suburb of Masvingo in south-eastern Zimbabwe. It is the second largest high density suburb, located south east of Masvingo.

There are two masvingo city run primary schools in Rujeko, Rujeko and Shakashe Primary Schools. Rujeko is divided into three, Rujeko A, B and C.

References

Masvingo